Skerry Champion is a variety of potato with a round-to-oval shape and creamy yellow skin with a beautiful blue/purple "birthmark" colouring. 'Skerry Champions' have only recently become available to growers again after a long period of absence due to a host of viral diseases it was carrying. Taste quality is excellent with a lovely flavour and floury texture. They are quite highly resistant to blight however the tops of diseased haulms should be removed to keep tubers healthy.  It has also been known as Buchan Beauty and although introduced into Ireland in 1922, may have existed in the UK before then.

References 

Potato cultivars